"Mademoiselle from Armentières" is an English song that was particularly popular during World War I.  It is also known by its ersatz French hook line, 'Inky Pinky Parlez Vous,' or the American variant 'Hinky Dinky Parlez-vous' (variant: Parlay voo). 'Inky Pinky' was a Scottish children's name for parsnip and potato cakes, but it has been suggested that an onomatopoeic reference to the sound of bed springs is a more likely soldier's ribald derivation.

Origins
"Mademoiselle from Armentières" has roots in a tradition of older popular songs; its immediate predecessor seems to be the song "Skiboo" (or "Snapoo"), which was also popular among British soldiers of World War 1. Earlier still, the tune of the song is thought to have been popular in the French Army in the 1830s; at this time the words told of the encounter of an inn-keeper's daughter, named Mademoiselle de Bar le Duc, with two German officers. During the Franco-Prussian War of 1870, the tune was resurrected, and again in 1914 when the British and Allied soldiers got to know it.

The Pittsburgh Post-Gazette of December 4, 1939, reported that the historical inspiration for the song had been a young Frenchwoman named Marie Lecoq (later Marie Marceau), who worked as a waitress at the Café de la Paix in Armentières at the time of the war. Despite the obscenity of many popular versions of the song, it was reportedly quite clean in its original form.

The song's first known recording was made in 1915 by music hall baritone Jack Charman.

Use

"Mademoiselle from Armentières" was considered a risqué song and not for 'polite company', and when sung on the radio and TV, as in The Waltons, typically only the first verse was sung. The lyrics on which this opinion is based are recorded in the Gordon "Inferno" Collection.

It is also the third part (the first two being "Has Anyone Seen the Colonel?" and "It's a Long Way to Tipperary") of the regimental march of Princess Patricia's Canadian Light Infantry.

Mademoiselle from Armentières was also the name of a 1926 British film directed by Maurice Elvey and starring Estelle Brody.

During World War II the comic duo Flanagan and Allen had a hit with "Mademoiselle from Armentières", with other music and lyrics written by Ted Waite, referring to the original song.

When Lindisfarne played their song "We Can Swing Together" on stage in the early 1970s, it developed into a lengthy harmonica medley which included a verse and chorus from this as well as several other songs, some also traditional.

"Three German Officers Crossed the Rhine" is a song with much more ribald set of lyrics, popular on rugby tours but sung to the same tune or to that of "When Johnny Comes Marching Home". It was originally sung in the allied trenches during the First World War.

A reworked version known as the “fart song” or as “an old lady of 92” was popular in schools, particularly in the UK, with lyrics celebrating a flatulent journey including Bristol and Rome.

A reworked version of the melody was used in the Israeli songwriter Haim Hefer's song "בחולות" ("Bacholot" or "Bakholot", "In the Sands"), best known for its performance by the singer Yossi Banai. The song consist of six stanzas telling of a tendency among the narrator's family males to take out the beloveds into (and conceive their children in) the titular sands.

Mademoiselle From Armentieres was the title of a 1927 espionage, thriller novel by Cecil Street, writing under the name John Rhode.

Lyrics
There are many variations to the lyrics, but a typical 1940s version of the song would go as follows:

Three German officers crossed the Rhine
Parlez-Vous
Three German officers crossed the Rhine
Parlez-Vous
Three German officers crossed the Rhine
To fuck the women and drink the wine
Inky pinky parlez-vous

They breached the line in a Tiger tank
Parlez-vous
They breached the line in a Tiger tank
Parlez-vous
They breached the line in a Tiger tank
One to drive and two to wank
Inky pinky parlez-vous

They came upon a wayside inn
Parlez-vous
They came upon a wayside inn
Parlez-vous
They came upon a wayside inn
Parked the tank and walked right in
Inky pinky parlez-vous

Oh landlord have you a daughter fair
Parlez-vous
Oh landlord have you a daughter fair
Parlez-vous
Oh landlord have you a daughter fair
With eyes of blue and long blonde hair
Inky pinky parlez-vous

My daughter she is much too young
Parlez-vous
My daughter she is much too young
Parlez-vous
My daughter she is much too young
To be fucked by you, you bastard Hun
Inky pinky parlez-vous

Oh father dear I'm not too young
Parlez-vous
Oh father dear I'm not too young
Parlez-vous
Oh father dear I'm not too young
I've been fucked by the blacksmith's son
Inky pinky parlez-vous

They fucked her in, they fucked her out
Parlez-vous
They fucked her up, they fucked her down
Parlez-vous
They fucked her till she was dead and then
They fucked her back to life again
Inky pinky parlez-vous

Lyricists 
There are several claims to having written the lyrics for this song:
 Edward Rowland and a Canadian composer, Gitz Rice
 Harry Carlton and Joe Tunbridge
 British songwriter Harry Wincott
 Alfred Charles Montin supposedly wrote "Mademoiselle from Armentières" while stationed in France and composed the music for "The Caissons Go Rolling Along" at Fort Sheridan, Ill., shortly before his unit was transferred to Fort Sill. The lyrics for the artillery march were written by Brig. Gen. Edmund L. Gruber, when he was a second lieutenant. Montin was born and raised in Nice, France. He migrated to the United States and started a tour of duty as an army band director in the days when the band was an important regimental organization. Also included in his music career was a tour with the famed John Philip Sousa Band.”

References

External links 
 One version of lyrics
 firstworldwar.com – Vintage Audio – Mademoiselle from Armentieres
 horntip.com – "Hinky Dinky Parleyvoo" (2148) & "Mademoiselle from Armentieres" from The Robert W. Gordon "Inferno" Collection in the Archive of Folk Song, Library of Congress
 horntip.com – Mademoiselle from Armentieres (3144) from The Robert W. Gordon "Inferno" Collection in the Archive of Folk Song, Library of Congress
 
 
 originals.be – More information about the song
  by Line Renaud

Songs of World War I
1915 songs
Songs about France